Happy Days, 1880–1892 (1940) is the first of an autobiographical trilogy by H.L. Mencken, covering his days as a child in Baltimore, Maryland from birth through age twelve. It was followed by Newspaper Days, 1899–1906 (1941) and Heathen Days, 1890–1936 (1943).

The book was received with some surprise by Mencken's readers, since, unlike his commentaries on current events, it is written with great warmth and affection.  Mencken's childhood was apparently happy and secure, and he enjoyed both living through it and reminiscing about it in later years.

Editions
 Happy Days: Mencken's Autobiography: 1880-1892 (Johns Hopkins University Press: Bumcombe Collection, 2006)

External links

1940 non-fiction books
Books by H. L. Mencken
Literary autobiographies